Elections were held in the Australian state of Western Australia in late 1908 to elect 50 members to the state's Legislative Assembly. The main polling day was 11 September, although five remote electorates went to the polls at later dates.

The governing Ministerialists (led by the premier, Newton Moore) lost five seats, but retained a majority government. The Labour Party, led by Thomas Bath, gained eight seats for a total of 22, equalling their record set at the 1904 election. For the first time, no independents were elected.

Key dates
 Issue of writs: Wednesday 26 August
 Close of nominations: Thursday 3 September
 Main polling day: Friday 11 September
Return of writs: Saturday 19 September
 Polling day for Roebourne: Wednesday 30 September
Return of writs: Saturday 10 October
 Polling day for Gascoyne: Thursday 1 October
Return of writs: Thursday 15 October
 Polling day for Dundas and Pilbara: Friday 16 October
Return of writs: Friday 23 October
 Polling day for Kimberley: Friday 23 October
Return of writs: Saturday 31 October

Results

|}

See also
 Members of the Western Australian Legislative Assembly, 1905–1908
 Members of the Western Australian Legislative Assembly, 1908–1911

Notes
 The total number of enrolled voters was 135,979, of whom 21,898 were registered in nine uncontested seats. Four of the uncontested seats were won by Ministerialists and five by Labour.

References

Elections in Western Australia
1908 elections in Australia
1900s in Western Australia
September 1908 events
October 1908 events